Nops guanabacoae is a species of medium-sized caponiid spider with only two eyes and carapace uniformly orange. N. guanabacoae is the type species of genus Nops, more information on this article.

Description
Differ from other Nops species by the male and female genitalia.

Distribution
Extensively distributed throughout the archipelago of Cuba.

Habitat
Soil spiders inhabiting preferably under stones and in leaf litter.

References

Fauna of Cuba
Caponiidae
Spiders of the Caribbean
Spiders described in 1839